Stuart Forbes is a male former rower who competed for Great Britain and England.

Rowing career
Forbes represented Great Britain in World Rowing Cup. He represented England and won a gold medal in the lightweight coxless four, at the 1986 Commonwealth Games in Edinburgh, Scotland.

References

English male rowers
Commonwealth Games medallists in rowing
Commonwealth Games gold medallists for England
Rowers at the 1986 Commonwealth Games
Medallists at the 1986 Commonwealth Games